HGP may refer to: 

 Haryana Gana Parishad, a political party in India
 Holy Ghost Preparatory School, in Bensalem, Pennsylvania, United States
 Human Genome Project
 Progeria (Hutchinson–Gilford progeria)
 Homegrown Player in Major League Soccer; see Homegrown Player Rule (Major League Soccer)